The Bukit Bintang MRT station, otherwise known Pavilion Kuala Lumpur–Bukit Bintang MRT station due to sponsorship reasons, (working name: Bukit Bintang Sentral station) is a Mass Rapid Transit (MRT) underground station in Kuala Lumpur, Malaysia. Construction started around 2012 and opened on 17 July 2017. It served as one of the stations on the Klang Valley Mass Rapid Transit (KVMRT) Kajang Line, formerly known as Sungai Buloh–Kajang Line. The station has 5 walkways and entrances that is connected to iconic buildings and malls in the Bukit Bintang locality, including Pavilion KL, Starhill Gallery and Fahrenheit 88 shopping malls. The main theme of the MRT station is Dynamic Pulse of Colour.

This MRT station, despite its name, is not integrated and not to be confused with the separate Bukit Bintang Monorail station, which is serviced by the KL Monorail line instead. Paid zone-to-paid zone integration was once proposed but not constructed at the moment.

History and background
According to earlier plans, there were meant to be two stations in Bukit Bintang, namely Bukit Bintang West and Bukit Bintang East (or Bukit Bintang 1 and Bukit Bintang 2), but was later reduced to only one Bukit Bintang station after public display and feedback. This was reflected in the stations rather odd numbering .

The construction of the MRT station started around 2012 and ended around mid-2017. It was opened on 17 July 2017 as part of Phase 2 of the Sungai Buloh-Kajang Line.

Station naming rights 
The station naming rights are acquired by Pavilion Kuala Lumpur that owns the Pavilion Kuala Lumpur shopping center, a high-end and high-street shopping mall, situated in the vicinity of the station located east of the station.

Location 

The MRT station is situated in the heart of Bukit Bintang (translated from Malay to English as "Starhill"), a shopping hub in the Kuala Lumpur Golden Triangle commercial district. Located underneath Jalan Bukit Bintang, the station's entrances are located along the iconic intersection of Jalan Bukit Bintang and Jalan Sultan Ismail.

Interchange 

The station will only be connected to the station to the Bukit Bintang Monorail station located right beside the station, and not by paid area-to-paid area transfer, due to the lack of space, although it might be proposed and constructed in the future. Those transferring from the MRT station to the monorail station will have to walk along the Yayasan Selangor building or Lot 10 shopping mall to get to the MRT station from the Monorail station and vice versa, although both stations are only a stone's throw away from each other. The walkway to the monorail station is uncovered.

This arrangement was similar to Masjid Jamek, in which the Ampang Line and Kelana Jaya Line stations were not integrated and functioned as two separate stations, until their ticketing systems were integrated in 2011.

Station Layout 

The layout for the station has its own unique features that are not found in other stations in the Klang Valley. It has up to 5 entrances around the crossroads of Jalan Bukit Bintang and Jalan Sultan Ismail, allowing commuters access to several malls in the vicinity, for example Pavilion Kuala Lumpur and Lot 10. The station, being located in an area with limited space, required it to be built underground at about 28m deep. This was to avoid demolishing buildings along the Jalan Bukit Bintang road to make way for construction. The station contains the longest escalator for all 31 stations along the SBK route at 20 metres. Bukit Bintang MRT station is also unique in a sense that it is one of only two stations on the line with split platforms, which means the platforms are stacked one on the other; one for -bound trains and one for Kajang-bound trains.

Exits and Entrance 

Exit B is reserved for the future integration between the MRT station and the Monorail station.

Design 

As with all of the underground station of the MRT, Bukit Bintang station is also given an artistic interior theme, which is "Dynamic". The theme, chosen to represent the dynamic and exciting elements of the country's top central business district, is reflected with different tones of red on the walls in the interior of the station that suggest movements.

Around the station 
 Fahrenheit 88
 Lot 10
 Starhill Gallery
 Sungei Wang Plaza
 Pavilion Kuala Lumpur
 Bukit Bintang monorail station

References

External links
 Klang Valley Mass Rapid Transit website

Rapid transit stations in Kuala Lumpur
Sungai Buloh-Kajang Line